Dalal Street in Financial District of Fort in Mumbai, is the address of the Bombay Stock Exchange and several financial institutions of the world. The term “Dalal Street” has become a metonym for the financial markets of India, as a whole the Indian financial service industry or the financial district itself. The Marathi word  means "a broker", "a go-between".

In the media
The Mumbai based video game Mumbai Gullies is expected to feature the Dalal Street in the fictional map.

See also
 Bombay Stock Exchange
 Phiroze Jeejeebhoy Towers
 Phiroze Jamshedji Jeejeebhoy
 Fort (Mumbai)
 Economy of India
 Economy of Mumbai

References

External links 
 Bombay Stock Exchange — official web site
 National Stock Exchange official web site
 DalalStreets.com - official web site

Streets in Mumbai
Economy of Mumbai
Financial districts in India
Retail markets in India